Ana Teresa Barboza (born 1981) is a Peruvian textile artist. 

Barboza was born and raised in Lima, Peru. She attended the Pontifical Catholic University of Peru (PCUP). Her works are "three-dimensional textile art that depicts natural forms such as plant life and landscapes." She is "known for her "labour-intensive, mixed-media works that use patchwork, knitting or embroidery." Her 2018 work, Torcer, is "made from woven fabric, wool and alpaca embroidered onto a digital photographic print." She sometime combines botanically dyed materials with her botanical subject matter.

References

1981 births
Living people
21st-century women artists
Peruvian women artists
Textile artists
Women textile artists
Date of birth missing (living people)
Embroiderers